"Pink Cookies in a Plastic Bag Getting Crushed by Buildings" is a single from LL Cool J's fifth album, 14 Shots to the Dome. It was released on June 1, 1993, along with "Back Seat (of My Jeep)". The original version was produced by Marley Marl; however the more popular remix was produced by Easy Mo Bee. The song reached #2 on the Hot Rap Songs and #24 on the Hot R&B Songs charts.

Song background
Thirty different hip-hop artists are mentioned in the song's lyrics: I'll take 30 electric chairs, and put 'em in a classroom, 30 MCs, and set 'em free from their doom. The title of the song came to the artist at random during a marijuana-influenced phone conversation, but was confirmed decades later on Twitter by the artist to be a reference to prolapse, as well as the moment of a man tossing woman onto a bed in the middle of sexual climax. When asked by NORE and DJ EFN in an interview, he originally stated:

Later, LL Cool J shared on Twitter:

The music video (directed by Brett Ratner) for the song was made in May 1993. However, it uses the remix instead of the original version.

Track listing

A-side
"Pink Cookies in a Plastic Bag Getting Crushed by Buildings" (LP version) – 4:17
"Pink Cookies in a Plastic Bag Getting Crushed by Buildings" (instrumental) – 4:12

B-side
"Pink Cookies in a Plastic Bag Getting Crushed by Buildings" (Remix) – 4:23
"Pink Cookies in a Plastic Bag Getting Crushed by Buildings" (Remix Instrumental) – 4:23
"Back Seat (Of My Jeep)" – 4:32

References

1992 songs
1993 singles
LL Cool J songs
Def Jam Recordings singles
Songs written by LL Cool J
Song recordings produced by Marley Marl
Songs written by Marley Marl
Music videos directed by Brett Ratner
New jack swing songs